Clara Bowdoin Winthrop (born March 12, 1876, Boston, Massachusetts - died March 15, 1969) was a philanthropist, art collector, and relative of John Kerry, a U.S. Senator and former presidential candidate. 

Winthrop was the daughter of Robert and Elizabeth Winthrop and a descendant of John Winthrop. As an adult, she was a wealthy and childless philanthropist, funding the education of John Kerry, her sister's grandson. The Boston Globe wrote:
"Among the array of relatives who looked after John, none was more important to his education than great-aunt Clara Winthrop, who had no children of her own. She owned an estate in Manchester-by-the-Sea, complete with a bowling alley inside a red barn. Winthrop offered to pay for much of John's prep school education, an expensive proposition far beyond the means of Kerry's parents. "It was a great and sweet and nice thing from an aunt who had no place to put [her money]," Kerry said. Such a gift today might be worth about $30,000 per year, given the school's typical annual cost before subsidies."

Winthrop was a world traveler, and is known to have visited India. While on a trip to Italy, Winthrop purchased an oil painting which was thought to be a reproduction of a work by Andrea del Sarto. In 1935 she donated the painting to the All Saints' Episcopal Church in West Newbury, Massachusetts. The painting hung over the choir stalls in an enormous gilt frame for several years until it was taken down and stored in a closet, and then in the rectory's attic. In 1999, it was discovered that the painting was not an imitation, but was The Madonna and Child by del Sarto. The painting was then sold at auction by Sotheby's for $1,102,500.

The Clara B. Winthrop Trust is named for her.

References

1876 births
1969 deaths
American art collectors
Philanthropists from Massachusetts
People from Boston
Winthrop family